Uve Sabumei was the first Papua New Guinean national to coach the PNG Kumuls rugby league team.

References

Papua New Guinea national rugby league team coaches
Papua New Guinean rugby league coaches
Possibly living people
Year of birth missing